Modou Jagne (born 14 February 1983) is a footballer from Gambia. He plays for the Gambia senior squad. He was signed to SC Rheindorf Altach in Austria until his release in January 2009.  Jagne then signed with SK Austria Kärnten until the club went bankrupt in June 2010.

External links
 Profile & Statistics at Guardian's Stats centre
 

1983 births
Living people
Sportspeople from Banjul
Gambian footballers
Association football forwards
SC Rheindorf Altach players
Austrian Football Bundesliga players
The Gambia international footballers
Expatriate footballers in Austria